SuperNews!  is a 2005-2010 half-hour, satirical animated television series which aired on Current TV. It was created by Josh Faure-Brac who also wrote for the show and performed the majority of male voices. The show is primarily based on popular culture satire and political humor. Frequent characters include animated interpretations of such mainstream figures as President of the United States Barack Obama, Vice President Joe Biden, Hillary Clinton, Senator John McCain, and various pop-culture icons and celebrities such as Lindsay Lohan, Perez Hilton, and Britney Spears. 67 episodes were produced.

History
Josh Faure-Brac created the pilot for SuperNews! in 2005 which was developed to appear with the launch of the new cable network Current TV and subsequently all of the art and animation was created by Faure-Brac and Steven K. L. Olson until 2006. Faure-Brac and Olson were then joined by animator Dustin McLean (of literal music video) who later became assistant director for the show. SuperNews! episodes (short-form segments) aired in Current TV's "shuffle" rotation.

In March 2009, as Current TV started shifting to more traditional 30-minute programming, the show transitioned to a full half-hour program consisting of several shorts married together by thematic transitions. During these transitions, the show's logo and mascot Earf would appear in very brief scenes that often related to the previous or upcoming segment.

Season 2 premiered on November 12, 2009.

SuperNews! formerly aired every Thursday night on Current TV at 11:00 P.M./10:00 P.M. Central

SuperNews! was cancelled on May 12, 2010.

Episode list

Half-hour episodes

1st season

2nd season

*Episode was earlier on the Internet

Voice performers
Frequent voice performers are Josh Faure-Brac, Jason Nash, Natasha Leggero, Jordan Peele, Brian Shortall, Rebecca Sage Allen, Jonah Ray, Jerry Minor, Sarah Haskins.

Between Seasons 1 and 2
SuperNews! Collabo-Jam
Hosted by Josh Faure-Brac and "Weird Al" Yankovic, this Collabo-Jam Super Special includes Al and Josh's favorite clips from SuperNews! and some of Al's classic music videos. Plus, the world premiere of the new "Weird Al" music video, "Ringtone" from the Internet Leaks EP is animated by the SuperNews! team.

SuperNews! Classics
From August to October 2009, SuperNews! produced a compilation of previously released episodes from before it became a full-time show.
 SuperNews! Has Sex! 08.06.09
 Starring George W. Bush! 08.17.09
 Josh's Classic Favorites 08.29.09
 Political Moments in Time 09.12.09
 The Real Divas of SuperNews! 09.19.09
 Staff Picks 09.26.09
 Scary S#@! 10.03.09
 Pre-President Obama 10.10.09

Rambo vs. Terror was also recompiled and aired as a classic.

In October 2009, SuperNews! made a cartoon called The First Halloween, seemingly to explain the holiday in addition to their already explained Thanksgiving and Christmas.

References

External links
 

2000s American adult animated television series
2000s American political comedy television series
2000s American satirical television series
2000s American sketch comedy television series
2000s American television news shows
2010s American adult animated television series
2010s American political comedy television series
2010s American satirical television series
2010s American sketch comedy television series
2010s American television news shows
2005 American television series debuts
2010 American television series endings
American adult animated comedy television series
American flash adult animated television series
English-language television shows
Current TV original programming
American news parodies
Animation based on real people
Cultural depictions of Barack Obama
Political satirical television series